This is the complete filmography of actress Marguerite Chapman (March 9, 1918 – August 31, 1999).

Born in Chatham, New York, she had humble beginnings as a typist and switchboard operator in White Plains, New York, until her beauty was brought to the attention of the John Powers Modeling Agency in New York City, where she went on to become a high-demand pictorial and magazine model. 

Relocating to Los Angeles, California, in December 1939, she would appear in several westerns, musicals, comedies, and dramas within the next two decades, working with such major studios as 20th Century Fox, Warner Bros., Republic Pictures, and Columbia. She later became a household name through television, appearing on several well-known sitcoms of the day throughout the 1950s up until her retirement in 1977.

Film and television appearances 

1940: On Their Own as Margaret
1940: Four Sons as Peasant (uncredited)
1940: Charlie Chan at the Wax Museum as Mary Bolton
1941: A Girl, a Guy, and a Gob as Cecilia Grange
1941: The Great Lie as Enthusiastic Film Fan in Trailer (uncredited)
1941: Navy Blues as Navy Blues Sextet member
1941: West of the Rockies (Short)
1941: The Body Disappears as Christine Lunceford
1941: You're in the Army Now as Navy Blues Sextette member
1942: The Playgirls (Short) as Sextette member
1942: Spy Smasher as Eve Corby
1942: Meet the Stewarts as Ann (uncredited)
1942: Submarine Raider as Sue Curry
1942: Parachute Nurse as Glenda White
1942: A Man's World as Mona Jackson
1942: The Daring Young Man as Ann Minter
1942: The Spirit of Stanford as Fay Edwards
1943: One Dangerous Night as Eve Andrews
1943: Murder in Times Square as Melinda Matthews
1943: Appointment in Berlin as Ilse Von Preising
1943: Destroyer as Mary Boleslavski
1943: My Kingdom for a Cook as Pamela Morley
1944: Strange Affair as Marie Dumont Baumler
1945: Counter-Attack as Lisa Elenko
1945: Pardon My Past as Joan
1946: One Way to Love as Marcia Winthrop
1946: The Walls Came Tumbling Down as Patricia Foster, AKA Laura Browning
1947: Mr. District Attorney as Marcia Manning
1948: Relentless as Luella Purdy
1948: Coroner Creek as Kate Hardison
1948: The Gallant Blade as Nanon de Lartigues
1949: The Green Promise as Deborah Matthews
1950: Kansas Raiders as Kate Clarke
1951 The Bigelow Theatre (TV Series)
1951: Flight to Mars as Alita
1952: Man Bait as Stella Tracy
1952: Sea Tiger as Jenine Duval
1952: Bloodhounds of Broadway as Yvonne Dugan
1952–1953: Chevron Theatre (TV Series)
1953: Fireside Theatre (TV Series) as Wanda Brown
1953: Schlitz Playhouse (TV Series) as Vicky
1953: Hollywood Opening Night (TV Series)
1953: The Revlon Mirror Theater (TV Series) as Elaine Merrill
1953–1954: The Pepsi-Cola Playhouse (TV Series) as Ann Scotland / Barbara Nicholson
1954: Four Star Playhouse (TV Series) as Lisa / Linda
1954: Private Secretary (TV Series) as Dorian France
1955: The Whistler (TV Series) as Fran Gilbert
1953–1955: City Detective (TV Series) as Rose / Leona
1955: The Seven Year Itch as Miss Morris
1955: Science Fiction Theatre (TV Series) as Jean Forester
1955: Jane Wyman Presents The Fireside Theatre (TV Series) as Janet
1955: The Star and the Story (TV Series) 
1956: Celebrity Playhouse (TV Series) 
1956: TV Reader's Digest (TV Series) as Nancy Drake
1956: Strange Stories (TV Series) as Ann Scotland
1955–1956: Lux Video Theatre (TV Series) as Lenore / Jane Drake / Linda
1952–1957: The Ford Television Theatre (TV Series) as Louise / Beth Rathburn
1954–1957: Studio 57 (TV Series) as Ann Scotland / Janet / Pamela, American Official / Phyllis Warrender
1957: The Eve Arden Show (TV Series) as Mother
1955–1957: Climax! (TV Series) as Kitty / Wife / Mrs. Carter / Myra Saunders
1958: Studio One in Hollywood (TV Series) as Laura Adams
1958: Richard Diamond, Private Detective (TV Series) as Norma Randall
1958: The Millionaire (TV Series) as Myra Putnam
1958: Pursuit (TV Series)
1959: Rawhide (TV Series) as Madge
1959: The Ann Sothern Show (TV Series) as Stella
1959: The Lineup (TV Series) as Cara
1960: The Amazing Transparent Man as Laura Matson
1960: Perry Mason (TV Series) as Faye Donner
1961: Laramie (TV Series) as Valerie Farrell
1962: Frontier Circus (TV Series) as Theresa Haskill
1971: Marcus Welby, M.D. (TV Series) as Angie's mother
1975: Hawaii Five-O (TV Series) as Patron
1976: Police Story (TV Series) as Becky
1977: Barnaby Jones (TV Series) as Operator (final appearance)

References 

Actress filmographies
American filmographies